Roberto Nascimento dos Santos (born 5 September 1987 in Maceió), commonly known as Roberto Pítio, is a Brazilian football forward who currently plays as a forward for Marcílio Dias.

Career

FC Spartak Trnava
Pítio joined Spartak Trnava in January 2010.

References

External links

Roberto Pitio at ZeroZero

Brazilian footballers
Brazilian expatriate footballers
1987 births
Living people
Association football forwards
Expatriate footballers in Slovakia
Brazilian expatriate sportspeople in Slovakia
Slovak Super Liga players
Campeonato Brasileiro Série C players
Iraty Sport Club players
Operário Ferroviário Esporte Clube players
Londrina Esporte Clube players
FC Spartak Trnava players
Esporte Clube São Bento players
J. Malucelli Futebol players
Esporte Clube Noroeste players
Associação Esportiva Velo Clube Rioclarense players
Sertãozinho Futebol Clube players
Clube Recreativo e Atlético Catalano players
Central Sport Club players
Rio Branco Sport Club players
Sociedade Esportiva do Gama players
Clube Atlético Bragantino players
Fluminense de Feira Futebol Clube players
Roberto Pitio
Agremiação Sportiva Arapiraquense players
Associação Ferroviária de Esportes players
Clube Náutico Marcílio Dias players
Sportspeople from Alagoas